2nd Round may refer to:

 2nd Round, an album by Sporto Kantes, 2004
 "2nd Round", a song by Usher from Looking 4 Myself, 2012
 Second Round (album), by Mayday, 2011